Nautilus cookanum is an extinct species of nautilus. It lived during the Eocene epoch. N. cookanum placed within the genus Nautilus, together with extant species based on their shared shell characters. Fossils of the species from the Late Eocene Hoko River Formation are noted as one of the two oldest occurrences for the genus  (with the other, older occurrence being N. praepompilius of the Paleogene).

References

Prehistoric nautiloids
Nautiluses
Eocene molluscs
Eocene animals of North America
Fossil taxa described in 1892